Endospermum medullosum, commonly known as the whitewood, is a dioecious plant that grows in the tropical islands. It grows in tropical humid climates. The species is well known for timber.

Distribution
Endospermum medullosum grows naturally in the tropical islands including New Guinea, Indonesia, as well as the Solomon Islands which are east of New Guinea. The tree is also native to Vanuatu, an island chain east-northeast of Australia.

Habitat and ecology
Endospermum grows in humid lowland tropical climates where the temperature averages 22–28 degrees Celsius, with a mean rainfall of 1500–5600 mm annually. The species can grow in a variety of soil including soil that has been deposited by water flow next to rivers. Typically the plant grows in acidic to neutral soil. Additionally, the species grows in swamps.

Growth
The tree can grow up to 2.5-3m for the first couple of years and it is important the species has enough space to grow to maintain this growth rate. Under optimal conditions the fruits of the plant appear in the first 3–4 years. Endospermum medullosum has limited tolerance to various environmental conditions. These conditions include drought, shade, high wind speeds, and salt spray. Since the species did not evolve in these environments, growth under these conditions will be limited. The tree can grow fairly quickly in locations that are sunny.

Morphology
The tree is generally 20–40 m tall and typically grows no more than 54m. The trunk of the tree, also known as the bole, is usually straight, though in some leaves, leaning occurs. The bole has a general height of 10-24m. The roots that grow on the sides of the tree, known as buttresses may grow up to 1m. The inner bark of the species is yellow to brown in color where the outer bark is pale brown to yellow in color. In its mature form, the crown of the tree that includes the above ground parts have an umbrella form, with immense branches that grow horizontally. The leaves of this plant are 8–25 cm long and green in color. The leaves are arranged in clusters and are hairy.

Flowers and fruit
Endospermum medullosum is dioecious, i.e., each tree has either male or female flowers, and therefore cannot self-fertilize. The flowers are generally small and are greenish white in color. The inflorescence type is a raceme.  

The flowers lack petals. The male flowers generally have 5-12 stamens with sepals that are cup-shaped. The female flowers lack a style, and have one locule, the compartment in the ovary that contains the ovules. The number of locules varies within different species in the genus; hence, this the best way to distinguish the medullosum species. The fruits of the species in the genus are berry-like, or baccate. The fruit contains a single brownish-black seed that is approximately 6 mm in length. The fruits are a common source of food for birds.

Propagation
Endospermum medullosum can be propagated from seeds as well as vegetative cuttings. With seed propagation, seeds should be collected quickly when they mature and planted within a few days. The seeds should be collected when the fruits go from dark green to light green. Usually 9,000-9,600 fruits produce 30,000-35,000 seeds. The species has low seed viability; therefore it is beneficial to raise the plant from cuttings. These cuttings are usually taken from hedges in misty conditions.

Uses
There are many uses of Endospermum medullosum. The whitewood is commonly used for canoes and can also be used for firewood. However the main use of the wood is for timber. It is highly priced in Japan, where it is widely selected. Whitewood timber is commonly used for furniture, shingles, moldings as well as other decorative purposes in the islands. The whitewood is efficient for such uses since it has even texture and dries fairly quickly.

The immature leaves of this species are often utilized as a vegetable.

The plant also has medicinal uses; in Vanuatu the bark is used to treat rheumatism and is also used to relieve stomachaches, as is the sap of the tree.

Agroforestry
Endospermum medullosum is well known as a soil stabilizer, given how their roots grow close to under the soil. When the leaves deteriorate, they provide organic material for the soil. Additionally, the whitewood provides optimal conditions for plants that grow in shady areas.

References

Adenoclineae